Big Beaver Creek is a  tributary of the Pequea Creek in western Lancaster County, Pennsylvania in the United States.

The tributary South Fork meets near New Providence to form the main stem of Big Beaver Creek. 

Big Beaver Creek enters the Pequea at the village of Herrville.

See also
List of Pennsylvania rivers

References

External links
U.S. Geological Survey: PA stream gaging stations

Rivers of Lancaster County, Pennsylvania
Tributaries of the Susquehanna River
Rivers of Pennsylvania